Dillatronic is a compilation album by hip hop musician J Dilla, released posthumously on October 30, 2015, through Vintage Vibez Music Group. This album is a collection of over 40 unreleased instrumentals, put together by Dilla's mother Ma Dukes and Vintage Vibez. Dillatronic was made available as a 3×LP set, on CD, and in a variety of deluxe edition packages with T-shirts, bags, cassettes, posters, and other collectables.

Track listing
All tracks are produced by J Dilla.

References

J Dilla albums
Hip hop compilation albums
Compilation albums by American artists
2015 albums
Instrumental albums